Pakistan has 36 national parks. As of 2012, 25 of these are under supervision of respective provincial governments and remaining are in private care. Only some of these are under the conservation scope of International Union for Conservation of Nature. Protection and conservation of the environment of Pakistan was included in the concurrent constitution of 1973. As a result, Environment Protection Ordinance was enacted in 1983, which was mainly regulated by the Environment and Urban Affairs Division. Later, a new system of 'Modern Protected Areas' legislation began at the provincial level which assigned the protected areas with designations such as national parks, wildlife sanctuaries and game reserves. Further recommendations of the national parks of the Indomalayan realm were highlighted in the IUCN review of 1986. Nevertheless, the development of national parks was mainly carried out by National Conservation Strategy of 1992. Due to more awareness about their importance in conservation of biodiversity, 10 national parks have been established during the time period from 1993 to 2005.

According to the 'Modern Protected Areas' legislation, a national park is a protected area set aside by the government for the protection and conservation of its outstanding scenery and wildlife in a natural state. It is accessible to public for research, education and recreation. In order to promote public use, construction of roads and rest houses is permitted. Use of firearms, polluting water, cleaning of land for cultivation, destruction of wildlife is banned in these areas.

The oldest national park is Lal Suhanra in Bahawalpur District, established in 1972. It is also the only biosphere reserve of Pakistan. Lal Suhanra is the only national park established before the independence of the nation in August 1947. The main purpose of this area was to protect the wildlife of Cholistan Desert.

National parks

Pictures

See also 
 Protected areas of Pakistan

References

External links
 National Parks of Pakistan - Pakistan Tourism Portal
 29 Most Amazing National Parks of Pakistan - Manhoos
 Most Beautiful Places, Parks in Pakistan for Visitors - Easypakistan

National Parks
 
Pakistan
National parks